Siobhán Hapaska (born 1963) is an Irish sculptor.

Early life and education 
Hapaska was born in Belfast and studied art at Middlesex Polytechnic from 1985 to 1988 before completing a master's degree at Goldsmiths College in 1992. In 1993 she won a Barclays Young Artist Award and had her first solo exhibition at the Institute of Contemporary Arts in London during 1995 and 1996.

Work 
Hapaska works with a variety of synthetic and natural materials, and often incorporates sound and light elements into her work. Her sculptures range in form from completely abstracted to hyperrealistic.

References

Further reading 
"Hapaska, Siobhán." In Grove Art Online. (Oxford Art Online, accessed 30 March 2013).
Artist Biography for Siobhán Hapaska in the Tate Modern list of artists.

1963 births
Living people
20th-century Irish women artists
21st-century Irish women artists
20th-century women artists from Northern Ireland
21st-century women artists from Northern Ireland
Alumni of Goldsmiths, University of London
Alumni of Middlesex University
Artists from Belfast
Irish contemporary artists
Irish sculptors